Slashchyovskaya is a rural locality (a stanitsa) and the administrative center of Slashchyovskoye Rural Settlement, Kumylzhensky District, Volgograd Oblast, Russia. The population was 1,288 as of 2010. There are 43 streets.

Geography 
Slashchyovskaya is located on the right bank of the Khopyor River, 31 km southwest of Kumylzhenskaya (the district's administrative centre) by road. Shakin is the nearest rural locality.

References 

Rural localities in Kumylzhensky District
Don Host Oblast